Gens des nuages is a travel journal written in French by the French Nobel laureate J. M. G. Le Clézio and his wife Jémia.  Gens des nuages could be translated as meaning The Cloud People.

It was written during a trip to Sahara and published in 1997.

Jémia Le Clézio is a Sahrawi and her ancestors were nomads who lived in the desert area. After her grandmother left her country, she never visited the place before the trip.

References

1997 non-fiction books
Books by J. M. G. Le Clézio
French travel books
Works by J. M. G. Le Clézio
African travel books
Books about the Sahara